Daniel "Dani" Góngora Rodríguez (born 11 April 1994) is a Spanish footballer who plays as a right winger.

Club career
Born in Almería, Andalusia, Góngora represented Real Madrid, UCD La Cañada Atlético, Sevilla FC and Granada CF as a youth. He made his senior debut in 2013 with UD San Sebastián de los Reyes in Tercera División, and continued to appear in the category in the following years, with Los Molinos CF and Marino de Luanco.

In 2016 Góngora joined CD Lugo, being initially assigned to the farm team also in the fourth tier. On 5 March 2017 he made his first team debut, coming on as a second-half substitute for Fede Vico in a 1–2 home loss against UD Almería in the Segunda División championship.

References

External links

1994 births
Living people
Footballers from Almería
Spanish footballers
Association football wingers
Segunda División players
Tercera División players
UD San Sebastián de los Reyes players
Marino de Luanco footballers
Polvorín FC players
CD Lugo players
Real Jaén footballers
Caudal Deportivo footballers